Brendan Sexton (born 6 August 1985) is an Australian triathlete.

At the 2012 Summer Olympics men's triathlon on Tuesday, 7 August, he placed 35th.

Winner of the 2013 Liverpool, England Triathlon, the 2014 Liverpool was cancelled due to weather. Runner up in the 2015 triathlon in Liverpool, England.

References 

1985 births
Living people
Australian male triathletes
Triathletes at the 2012 Summer Olympics
Olympic triathletes of Australia
20th-century Australian people
21st-century Australian people